The 2002 CIS Men's Final 8 Basketball Tournament was held March 15-17, 2002.  For the 15th straight year, it was played at the Halifax Metro Centre in Halifax, Nova Scotia.  The Alberta Golden Bears won their third national championship by beating the Western Ontario Mustangs.

Championship Bracket

Consolation Bracket

Note: All records are against CIS competition only.

Tournament All-Stars
Most Valuable Player: Stephen Parker (Alberta)
All-Stars:
Robbie Valpreda (Alberta)
Jimmy Grozelle (Western Ontario)
Andrew Kwiatkowski (Western Ontario)
Dean Labayen (York)
David Brownrigg (Laval)

References

External links 
 Bob Adams CIS Sports Page - 2001/02 Men's basketball

2002
2001–02 in Canadian basketball